Jung Sung-Sook (born January 26, 1972) is a South Korean judoka.

She won two Olympic bronze medals in the half-middleweight division in 1996 and 2000.
In 1994, Jung won the gold medal at the World judo championships in Chiba, Japan.

She is a 5-time champion in the half-middleweight division at the Asian Championships.

External links
 
 
 
 

1972 births
Living people
Judoka at the 1996 Summer Olympics
Judoka at the 2000 Summer Olympics
Olympic judoka of South Korea
Olympic bronze medalists for South Korea
Olympic medalists in judo
Asian Games medalists in judo
Judoka at the 1994 Asian Games
Judoka at the 1998 Asian Games
South Korean female judoka
Medalists at the 2000 Summer Olympics
Medalists at the 1996 Summer Olympics
Asian Games gold medalists for South Korea
Asian Games bronze medalists for South Korea
Medalists at the 1994 Asian Games
Medalists at the 1998 Asian Games
Universiade medalists in judo
Goodwill Games medalists in judo
Universiade gold medalists for South Korea
Competitors at the 1994 Goodwill Games